Menajerimi Ara is a Turkish drama and comedy television series signed by Ay Yapım, directed by Deniz Çelebi Dikilitaş, script written by Uğraş Güneş and Volkan Yazıcı, first episode aired on 25 August 2020. Blending drama and comedy, the series centers around the lives of four managers with their assistants at a prestigious talent agency. With each episode, actors from the cinema and television industry participate in the series as guests and portray themselves. Adapted from the French TV series Dix pour cent. The series ended with its 45th episode, which was broadcast on July 11, 2021.

Plot 
Four managers of talent agency Ego, namely Kıraç (Barış Falay), Feris (Canan Ergüder), Çınar (Fatih Artman) and Peride (Ayşenil Şamlıoğlu), deal with difficult situations every day and defend their business visions. They skillfully combine art and business, but their private and professional lives sometimes come into conflict. Managers and their assistants take us behind the scenes of the wild world of famous players; where laughter, emotions, intrigue, disappointment and tears constantly collide. Dicle (Ahsen Eroğlu), who entered this wild world for the first time, says that I am also in the war, starting from the bottom in his struggle against personalities whose egos are higher than their height.

Shots 
While the building where the imaginary talent agency EGO is located is 42 Plaza in Istanbul - Maslak, the house where the Dicle character stayed for the first 3 episodes is in the Kurtuluş district of Şişli district.  Some of the interior shots took place at the Beykoz Shoe Factory.

Cast and characters

Main characters 
 Kıraç Özdal (Barış Falay): One of the managers of EGO and Diçle's father
 Çınar Bilgin (Fatih Artman): One of the managers of EGO. 
 Diçle Ertem (Ahsen Eroğlu): Feris's assistant and Barış's friend
 Barış Havas (Deniz Can Aktaş): One of the actors that Feris managed.
 Peride Şener (Ayşenil Şamlıoğlu): One of the managers of EGO.
 Feris Dikmen (Canan Ergüder): One of the managers of EGO. She is self-confident and has a tough personality.  Dicle's manager. She went to the USA for 6 months with Serkan. (1–35)
 Ceyda Yücesoy (Özge Borak): Serkan's old friend.  EGO's partner and later new owner.
 Serkan Tahtacı (Serhat Teoman): Former EGO Agency manager who returned home from the USA. Owner of Berlin Agency. They cannot get along with Kıraç. Later, he buys EGO Agency from Mayda's father and decides to merge the two agencies. He returned to the USA with Feris. (12–35)

Side characters 
 Gulin Yetik (Gamze Karaduman): Kıraç's assistant
 Emrah Ayoglu (Semi Sirtikkizil): Çinar's assistant
 Aydin Havas (Beran Kotan): Barış's brother
 Beren Özdal (Yaprak Medine): Kıraç's step daughter, Mayda's daughter and Barış's co-actor

Guest artists 
The artists listed below have appeared in one episode in which they portrayed themselves or fictional characters.

Episodes 

It was broadcast on Tuesday evenings from episodes 1-8, and on Sunday evenings from episode 9.

Notes

References

External links  
 Menajerimi Ara on official website of Star TV

2020 Turkish television series debuts
Star TV (Turkey) original programming
Television series by Ay Yapım
Television series about television
Television series about actors
Television shows set in Istanbul
2021 Turkish television series endings